Fatebenefratelli Hospital (officially Ospedale San Giovanni Calibita Fatebenefratelli) is a hospital located on the western side of the Tiber Island in Rome. It was established in 1585 and is currently run by the Brothers Hospitallers of Saint John of God. The hospital is known for having sheltered  Jews during the Holocaust by diagnosing them with a fictitious disease called "Syndrome K".

History 
The origins of the hospital on the Tiber Island date to before 1000 CE, when an ancient temple dedicated to the Greek god of medicine, Asclepius, was replaced by a sanctuary dedicated to Bartholomew the Apostle, one of the Twelve Apostles of Jesus. The sanctuary provided aid for local populations of beggars, the poor, and the sick.

In 1539 Saint John of God founded the religious institute, the Brothers Hospital, in Granada, Spain. The institute was recognized in 1572 by Pope Pius V and was nicknamed "Fatebenefratelli, a phrase used by the saints while inviting passersby to do charity. The epithet means "You do well, brothers[, for God's sake]". In 1581, the Brothers Hospital founded a new hospital called " ("House of Orphans") in Piazza di Pietra, with around 20 beds. Two members of the institute, Brother Pietro Soriano and Brother Sebastiano Arias, moved to the Tiber Island. In 1585, the institute purchased a monastery with the help of Pope Gregory XIII; the monastery had previously been occupied by the Benedictine Sisters until 1573 and later by the Brotherhood of the Bolognese. The pontiff also granted them the adjoining church of St. John Calybita.

Fifteen saints settled on Tiber Island and introduced health care measures. During the 1656–57 plague outbreaks in Rome, the hospital specialized in the treatment of plague patients and formed a school to teach its staff to deal with epidemics. The hospital was recognized by the Special Commission of Health during the 1832 cholera outbreaks in Rome.

Eight years after the capture of Rome in 1870, the hospital management was dissolved in 1878. Three individuals bought the hospital for "private industry and interest". These three "mysterious" people were three friars who acted as buyers in disguise to elude the law still in force against possessing the work of religious hospitals. In 1892, the old management of the hospital was restored. During the nineteenth century, the hospital was strengthened against the floods of the Tiber River with the erection of surrounding walls. This construction was interrupted by World War I and resumed in 1922. The hospital added ophthalmology and fluoroscopy units, considered the first of their kind in Rome.

"Syndrome K" 

Initially, the hospital was used as a hospice on the premises of the San Giovanni Calibita Church. Later, it was expanded into a modern hospital by Dr. Giovanni Borromeo, who joined in 1934, with the help of Father Maurizio Bialek.

In 1938, Italy introduced antisemitic laws. The hospital had allowed the Jewish doctor Vittorio Emanuele Sacerdoti to work under false papers. With the Nazi occupation of Italy in September 1943 and the imposition of antisemitic laws against the Roman Jews, Sacerdoti – with the approval of Borromeo and Bialek – brought patients from the Jewish hospital to be cared for at Fatebenefratelli.

During the Nazi raid of the Jewish ghetto in Rome on October 16, 1943, Jewish escapees sought refuge at the hospital. Borromeo accepted them and declared that these new "patients" had been diagnosed with a contagious, fatal disease called Il Morbo di K ("the Syndrome K"), which could be interpreted as standing for "Koch disease" or "Kreps disease". The name was suggested by physician and anti-fascist activist Adriano Ossicini. The letter K was designated for the Jewish refugees to distinguish them from real patients. K was derived from the German officer Albert Kesselring, who led the troops in Rome, and from Sicherheitspolizei and Sicherheitsdienst chief Herbert Kappler, who was appointed as city police chief. "Syndrome K" was purported to be a neurological illness whose symptoms included convulsions, dementia, paralysis, and, ultimately, death from asphyxiation. While the symptoms of the disease were deliberately kept ambiguous, the Nazis were noted to refrain from investigating the hospital or even to conduct searches for Jews on the premises out of fear of contracting the disease. The Jewish patients were advised to appear ill and to cough loudly, affecting symptoms similar to tuberculosis.

Besides Fr. Maurizio and Borromeo, other doctors on staff assisted the Jewish patients and helped to move them to safer hideouts outside the hospital. In May 1944, the hospital was raided and five Jews from Poland were detained. However, the ruse saved approximately 100 refugees.

Fr. Maurizio and Borromeo also installed an illegal radio transmitter in the hospital basement and made contact with General Roberto Lordi of the Italian Royal Air Force. After World War II, Borromeo was lauded by Government of Italy for his work and was recognized as a Righteous Among the Nations by Yad Vashem. He died in the hospital on 24 August 1961.

Departments 
The hospital has following departments:

 Cardiology
 General surgery
 CRTI
 Endocrinology
 Gastroenterology
 Medicine
 Nephrology and Dialysis
 Neurology
 Oncology
 Orthopedics
 Obstetrics and Gynecology
 Otolaryngology
 Radiotherapy
 Neonatal Intensive Care
 Urology

Services and surgeries 
Following are the services provided and surgeries performed at the hospital:

Surgeries

 General Surgery
 Systemic Amyloidosis Surgery
 Surgery Cholesterol and Cardiovascular Disease Prevention
 Hematology Surgery
 Medicine Surgery
 Neurological Surgery
 Ophthalmology Surgery
 Dentistry Surgery
 Orthopedic Surgery
 Otolaryngology Surgery
 Pediatric Surgery
 Skin ulcers Surgery
 Urology Surgery
 Oncology and DH Surgery
 Disability support Surgery
 Food intolerances Surgery

Services

 Acupuncture Clinic
 Allergy Clinic
 Anesthesiology Clinic
 Angiology and Sclerosing Clinic
 Cardiology Clinic
 Dermatology Clinic
 Endocrinology Clinic
 Gastroenterology and Digestive Endoscopy Clinic
 Nephrology and Dialysis Clinic
 Homeopathy Clinic
 Obstetrics and Gynecology Clinic
 Pathological anatomy
 Laboratory Analysis
 Psychology and Psychotherapy
 Radiology
 Outpatient Service of Aesthetic Medicine
 Dietary Service
 Transfusion Service

Awards 
On 21 June 2016, the hospital was honored as a "House of Life" by the International Raoul Wallenberg Foundation.

References

External links 

 Official Home page

1585 establishments in Italy
Brothers Hospitallers of Saint John of God Order
Hospitals in Rome
Religious organizations established in the 1580s